Irma Luyting (born 1 January 1975) is a retired Dutch athlete who competes in compound archery. She won three bronze medals at the World Archery Championships, and was the inaugural world number one ranked archer for nearly one year from August 2001.

References

1975 births
Living people
Dutch female archers
Sportspeople from Zaanstad
World Archery Championships medalists
20th-century Dutch women
21st-century Dutch women